Ma Junliang (born 2 March 1998 in Guangzhou) is a Chinese professional football player who currently plays for Chinese Super League side Guangzhou R&F as a forward.

Club career
Ma Junliang was promoted to Chinese Super League side Guangzhou R&F first team squad by manager Dragan Stojković in the summer of 2016. He made his senior debut on 6 August 2017 in a 4–1 home victory against Liaoning FC, coming on as a substitute for Li Tixiang in the extra time. On 5 May 2018, he scored his first senior goal in a 4–2 home win over Shanghai Greenland Shenhua.

Career statistics
Statistics accurate as of match played 31 December 2020.

References

External links
 

1998 births
Living people
Chinese footballers
Association football forwards
Footballers from Guangzhou
Guangzhou City F.C. players
Chinese Super League players